Ugly Duckling fountain is a sculpture by Marshall Fredericks.

Examples 
There are eight examples, including Danish Village, Rochester Hills, Michigan, Greenville, Michigan, and the Danish Embassy, Washington, D.C.
In 2007, the Danish Village example was restored.

References

External links
https://www.flickr.com/photos/hanneorla/4070350260/
http://www.svsu.edu/fileadmin/websites/mfsm/NEW_WEBSITE/LINK_IMAGES/Swan_Duckling_Wash_DC_January_2009_004.jpg
 

1960 sculptures
Fountains in the United States
Fountains in Michigan
Sculptures of birds in the United States
Sculptures by Marshall Fredericks
Ducks in popular culture